Iker Moreno Diez De Bonilla (born 14 September 2003) is a Mexican professional footballer who plays as an attacking midfielder for Liga MX club América.

Career statistics

Club

References

External links
 
 
 

Living people
2003 births
Association football midfielders
Mexican footballers
Liga MX players
Club América footballers
Footballers from Guanajuato
People from Celaya